Robert Neil Wood (born 6 May 1948) was a rugby union player who represented Australia.

Wood, a lock, was born in Brisbane, Queensland and claimed 1 international rugby cap for Australia.

References

Australian rugby union players
Australia international rugby union players
1948 births
Living people
Rugby union locks
Rugby union players from Brisbane